Mickey Conroy,   Maj. USMC Ret. (November 1, 1927 – September 20, 2005) was an American politician who served as a California State Assemblyman from 1991 to 1996. Conroy once gained notoriety in the mid-1990s for sponsoring a bill that permitted the paddling of graffiti artists.

Conroy was born in Footedale, Pennsylvania. After serving in World War II with the Merchant Marines and later with the United States Navy, Conroy joined the Marine Corps and eventually retired with the rank of major.

In a 1991 special election, the conservative Republican was elected to represent Orange County's 67th Assembly District in Sacramento to succeed Doris Allen, who had been recalled from office. Conroy was an outspoken defender of traditional American values and fiscal responsibility. He served as the chairman of the Assembly Utilities and Commerce Committee. His efforts on behalf of California's veterans included leading the campaign for a veteran's national cemetery in Riverside, and Orange County veterans' charities.

In 1996, a sexual harassment lawsuit was brought by a former Conroy aide, Robyn Boyd.  A Sacramento jury rejected sexual harassment and battery allegations against Conroy, but found him guilty of inflicting emotional distress on his accuser, Robyn Boyd. She was awarded $386,240, though the state paid a slightly lower amount, $360,000, to settle Conroy's appeal.

Mickey Conroy died in 2005, his wife, Ann, died in 2009.  They are survived by their children; Michael and Kathy; son-in-law Larry; and grandchildren Justin, Brandon, and Jenna.

References

External links
Join California Mickey Conroy

Republican Party members of the California State Assembly
United States Marine Corps officers
United States Navy sailors
United States Merchant Mariners of World War II
People from Orange County, California
People from Fayette County, Pennsylvania
1927 births
2005 deaths
20th-century American politicians
United States Navy personnel of the Korean War
United States Marine Corps personnel of the Korean War
Military personnel from Pennsylvania